Joseph John O'Connor (c. 1880 – 2 February 1959) was an Irish republican, soldier and politician.

O'Connor was born in the 1880s and remembered seeing Charles Stewart Parnell as a child. He joined the Irish Volunteers in 1913 and by 1916 he was a captain in command of A Company, 3rd Battalion, Dublin Brigade under Éamon de Valera. When the vice-commandant failed to show for the 1916 Easter Rising de Valera made O'Connor his second in command. O'Connor remained with his company and de Valera at Bolands Mill until they became the last battalion to surrender. He was imprisoned at Frongoch internment camp in Wales and released in the 1917 amnesty.

Returning to Dublin O'Connor joined "The Squad" under Michael Collins and killed Captain John FitzGerald of the "Cairo Gang" on Bloody Sunday in 1920. By the end of the Irish War of Independence he was Commandant of the 3rd Battalion "Dev's Own". He was a member of the Irish Republican Army's "Banned Convention" in 1922 and in the Battle of Dublin during the Irish Civil War he held the Fianna HQ in York Street near St Stephen's Green. He escaped to Limerick and succeeded Ernie O'Malley as the Quarter-Master-General of the IRA with the rank of brigadier-general.

After the Civil War he became a cattle salesman and farmer. At the 1925 Seanad election, he was elected as a Cumann na nGaedheal senator, serving until 1936. Despite joining Fine Gael he presented de Valera with a scroll of those killed in the Easter Rising in a 20th anniversary remembrance. He also sued O'Malley in 1936 when his memoirs accused O'Connor of cowardice and he won £550 in damages.

References

1880s births
1941 deaths

Year of birth uncertain
Irish Republican Army (1919–1922) members
Irish farmers
Members of the 1925 Seanad
Members of the 1928 Seanad
Members of the 1931 Seanad
Members of the 1934 Seanad
Cumann na nGaedheal senators
Fine Gael senators